Fraser Coast Anglican College is a private school in Hervey Bay, Queensland.

The college was founded in 1995.

Summary
Fraser Coast Anglican College is an Anglican co-ed school and college accommodating 700 plus students starting from Kindergarten to Year Twelve. Apart from the academic program, students have the opportunity to participate in extracurricular activities such as: sports; fine arts and music; educational tours and excursions; outdoor camping, and leadership orientation programs.

Its current principal is Joe Wright.

References

External links
 

Anglican schools in Queensland
1995 establishments in Australia
Educational institutions established in 1995
Hervey Bay